Corps of Gendarmerie of San Marino
Corpo della Gendarmeria dello Stato della Città del Vaticano
Gendarmería Nacional Argentina

See also
Gendarmerie